MicroStrategy Incorporated is an American company that provides business intelligence (BI), mobile software, and cloud-based services. Founded in 1989 by Michael J. Saylor, Sanju Bansal, and Thomas Spahr, the firm develops software to analyze internal and external data in order to make business decisions and to develop mobile apps. It is a public company headquartered in Tysons Corner, Virginia, in the Washington metropolitan area. Its primary business analytics competitors include SAP AG Business Objects, IBM Cognos, and Oracle Corporation's BI Platform. Saylor is the Executive Chairman and, from 1989 to 2022, was the CEO.

History
Saylor started MicroStrategy in 1989 with a consulting contract from DuPont, which provided Saylor with $250,000 in start-up capital and office space in Wilmington, Delaware. Saylor was soon joined by company co-founder Sanju Bansal, whom he had met while the two were students at Massachusetts Institute of Technology (MIT). The company produced software for data mining and business intelligence using nonlinear mathematics, an idea inspired by a course on systems-dynamics theory that they took at MIT.

In 1992, MicroStrategy gained its first major client when it signed a $10 million contract with McDonald's. It increased revenues by 100% each year between 1990 and 1996. In 1994, the company's offices and its 50 employees moved from Delaware to Tysons Corner, Virginia.

On June 11, 1998, MicroStrategy became a public company via an initial public offering.

In 2000, the company founded Alarm.com as part of its research and development unit.

On March 20, 2000, after a review of its accounting practices, the company announced that it would restate its financial results for the preceding two years. Its stock price, which had risen from $7 per share to as high as $333 per share in a year, fell $120 per share, or 62%, in a day in what is regarded as the bursting of the dot-com bubble. 

In December 2000, the U.S. Securities and Exchange Commission brought charges against the company and its executives. A lawsuit was subsequently filed against MicroStrategy and certain of its officials over fraud. In December 2000, Saylor, Bansal, and the company's former CFO settled with the SEC without admitting wrongdoing, each paying $350,000 in fines. The officers also paid a combined total of $10 million in disgorgement. The company settled with the SEC, hiring an independent director to ensure regulatory compliance.

In February 2009, MicroStrategy sold Alarm.com to venture capital firm ABS Capital Partners for $27.7 million. The company introduced OLAP Services with a shared data set cache, to accelerate reports and ad hoc queries. In 2010, the company began developing and deploying business intelligence software for mobile platforms, such as the iPhone and iPad.

In 2011, the company expanded its offerings to include a cloud-based service, MicroStrategy Cloud. 

In 2013, MicroStrategy sold Angel to Genesys Telecommunications Laboratories for $110 Million. 

In January 2014, the company announced a new feature of the platform called PRIME (Parallel Relational In-Memory Engine), co-developed with Facebook.

In October 2014, the company announced plans to lay off 770 employees, a month after reducing Saylor's salary from $875,000 to $1 at his request.

In June 2015, MicroStrategy announced the general availability of MicroStrategy 10.

In the fall of 2018, the company released MicroStrategy 11.

In January 2019, MicroStrategy announced the general availability of MicroStrategy 2019.

In February 2020, the company announced its latest release, MicroStrategy 2020, including a new design for its HyperIntelligence analytics tool.

Saylor resigned as CEO effective August 8, 2022. Phong Le, who had been president, succeeded him. Saylor remains the Executive Chairman of MicroStrategy. In a press release announcing the transition, Saylor said that he would focus on the company's bitcoin acquisition strategy and that Phong would manage overall corporate operations.

On August 31, 2022, the Attorney General for the District of Columbia sued Saylor for tax fraud, accusing him of illegally avoiding more than $25 million in D.C. taxes by pretending to be a resident of other jurisdictions. MicroStrategy was accused of collaborating with Saylor to facilitate his tax evasion by misreporting his residential address to local and federal tax authorities and failing to withhold D.C. taxes. MicroStrategy said the case is "a personal tax matter involving Mr. Saylor" and called the claims against the company "false" and it would "defend aggressively against this overreach."

Bitcoin purchases
In August 2020, MicroStrategy invested $250 million in bitcoin as a treasury reserve asset, citing declining returns from cash, a weakening dollar and other global macroeconomic factors. The company went on to make several additional large purchases of bitcoin; as of September 19, 2022, MicroStrategy and its subsidiaries held approximately 130,000 Bitcoins, acquired at an aggregate purchase price of $3.98 billion, at an average purchase price of $30,639 per bitcoin. As of September 19, 2022, bitcoin was trading around $19,200. Saylor is the main driver behind this strategy.

On the company's quarterly earnings call on May 3, 2022, MicroStrategy CFO Phong Le stated that the company would face a margin call if bitcoin’s price fell to about $21,000. A margin call would obligate the company to sell some of its bitcoin holdings. Le stated that the company could add more collateral to its loan to avoid such a situation. After bitcoin's price fell to about $20,800 in June 2022, the company said that it had not received a margin call and that it has enough capital to withstand further volatility.

On December 22, 2022, MicroStrategy sold 704 BTC, which represented their first time selling any bitcoin, for an amount of around $11.8 million.

Products

MicroStrategy 2020, the company's latest platform release of its business intelligence software, includes improvements to the vendor's HyperIntelligence capabilities, an embedded analytics system using augmented intelligence and machine learning technology.

MicroStrategy 2019, the prior platform release, focused on three areas: federated analytics, allowing extended connectivity to data sources and applications; transformational mobility, for easier mobile application development; and HyperIntelligence, integrating Bluetooth identity detection and voice. The earlier suite of software, MicroStrategy 10, consisted of MicroStrategy Analytics, MicroStrategy Mobile, and Usher. MicroStrategy 10.10, released in December 2017, added MicroStrategy Workstation. It uses business intelligence and predictive analytics to search through and perform analytics on big data from a variety of sources, including data warehouses, Excel files, and Apache Hadoop distributions.

MicroStrategy Mobile, introduced in 2010, is a software platform integrating Analytics capabilities into apps for iPhone, iPad, Android, and BlackBerry. It allows easier access without needing to reformat the data for different platforms.

Usher is a digital credential and identity intelligence product that provides a secure way for organizations to control digital and physical access. It replaces physical badges and passwords with secure digital badges, and generates information on user behavior and resource usage. Usher uses three-factor authentication, out-of-band channels, time-limited codes, and bidirectional public key infrastructure encryption.

References

External links
 

1989 establishments in Virginia
Business intelligence software
Software companies based in Virginia
Online analytical processing
Companies based in Fairfax County, Virginia
American companies established in 1989
Software companies established in 1989
Companies listed on the Nasdaq
Big data companies
Business analysis
Business intelligence companies
Business software companies
Data companies
Data visualization software
1998 initial public offerings
Software companies of the United States